Horodov is a Ukrainian surname. Notable people with the surname include:

Oleksiy Horodov (born 1978), Ukrainian footballer
Valeriy Horodov (born 1961), Ukrainian footballer and manager

References